The 1987 Fila Trophy was a men's professional tennis tournament played on indoor carpet courts at a new venue, Palazzo Trussardi in Milan, Italy. The event was part of the 1987 Nabisco Grand Prix. It was the tenth edition of the tournament and was played from 30 March until 4 April 1987. Total attendance was almost 48,000. First-seeded Boris Becker won the singles title and earned $55,000 first-prize money.

Finals

Singles
 Boris Becker defeated  Miloslav Mečíř 6–4, 6–3
 It was Becker's 2nd singles title of the year and the 11th of his career.

Doubles
 Boris Becker /  Slobodan Živojinović defeated  Sergio Casal /  Emilio Sánchez 3–6, 6–3, 6–4

References

External links
 ITF tournament edition details

Fila Trophy
Milan Indoor
Fila Trophy
Fila Trophy
Fila Trophy